The 1884 Birthday Honours were appointments by Queen Victoria to various orders and honours to reward and highlight good works by citizens of the British Empire. The appointments were made to celebrate the official birthday of the Queen, and were published in The London Gazette in May and June 1884.

The recipients of honours are displayed here as they were styled before their new honour, and arranged by honour, with classes (Knight, Knight Grand Cross, etc.) and then divisions (Military, Civil, etc.) as appropriate.

United Kingdom and British Empire

Baron
James, Earl of Seafield, by the name, style, and title of Baron Strathspey, of. Strathspey, in the counties of Inverness and Moray

Knight Bachelor
Richard Dickeson, late Mayor of Dover
Frederick William Burton   Director of the National Gallery of London
Samuel Davenport, of South Australia

The Most Honourable Order of the Bath

Knight Grand Cross of the Order of the Bath (GCB)

Military Division

Army
General Sir Charles William Dunbar Staveley 
General Sir Collingwood Dickson 
General Sir Arthur Borton 
General Sir Henry Charles Barnston Daubeny 
General Sir James Brind

Knight Commander of the Order of the Bath (KCB)

Military Division
Royal Navy
Admiral Alfred Phillipps Ryder
Vice-Admiral George Ommanney Willes 

Army
Lieutenant-General Frederick Charles Arthur Stephenson 
Colonel Herbert Stewart  Aide-de-Camp to the Queen

Civil Division
The Honourable Spencer Cecil Brabazon Ponsonby-Fane  Comptroller of Accounts, Lord Chamberlain's Department
Henry Wentworth Acland  Regius Professor of Medicine in the University of Oxford

Companion of the Order of the Bath (CB)

Military Division
Royal Navy
Captain Hilary Gustavus Andoe
Captain Ernest Neville Rolfe

Army
Major-General John Davis
Colonel Edward Alexander Wood, 10th Hussars
Colonel Barnes Slyfield Robinson, Princess Victoria's' (Royal Irish Fusiliers)
Colonel Cornelius Francis Clery
Brigade Surgeon Edmund Greswold McDowell, Army Medical Department
Lieutenant-Colonel William Green, the Black Watch (Royal Highlanders)
Lieutenant-Colonel William Byam, York and Lancaster Regiment
Lieutenant-Colonel Arthur George Webster, 19th Hussars
Lieutenant-Colonel John Charles Ardagh  (Civil), Royal Engineers
Lieutenant-Colonel Percy Harry Stanley Barrow  19th Hussars
Assistant Commissary-General Robert Arthur

Civil Division
The Honourable William Nassau Jocelyn, Her Majesty's Chargé d'Affaires at Darmstadt
John Gardner Dillman Engleheart, Clerk of the Council cf the Ducliy of Lancaster
Francis Mowatt, Principal Clerk in Her Majesty's Treasury

The Most Exalted Order of the Star of India

Knight Grand Commander (GCSI)

His Highness Chama Rajendra Wadeir, Maharajah of  Mysore

Companion (CSI)
Sir Jamsetjee Jeejeebhoy  Additional Member of the Council of the Governor of Bombay for making Laws and Regulations
Charles Gonne, Bombay Civil Service, Chief Secretary to the Government of Bombay, Additional Member of the Council of the Governor of Bombay for making Laws and Regulations
William Wilson Hunter  Bengal Civil Service, Director-General of Statistics to the Government of India, Additional Member of the Council of the Viceroy and Governor-General of India for making Laws and Regulations
Colonel Robert Murray, Bengal Staff Corps, late Director-General of Telegraphs to the Government of India

The Most Distinguished Order of Saint Michael and Saint George

Knight Grand Cross of the Order of St Michael and St George (GCMG)
Sir Robert Richard Torrens 
Sir Alfred Stephen  formerly Chief Justice of New South Wales, now Lieutenant-Governor of that Colony

Knight Commander of the Order of St Michael and St George (KCMG)
Thomas Charles Scanlen, late First Minister of the Cape of Good Hope
Colonel William Crossman  Royal Engineers, one of Her Majesty's Commissioners appointed in 1882 to inquire into the Revenue and Expenditure, &c., of certain of the West Indian Colonies
Frederick Napier Broome  Governor of Western Australia
Arthur Elibank Havelock  Governor of the West Africa Settlements

Companion of the Order of St Michael and St George (CMG)
Colonel Charles John Moysey, Royal Engineers, for services rendered in connection with South Africa
John Glasgow Grant, formerly Speaker of the House of Assembly and Member of the Legislative Council of the Island of Barbados
Edward Barnett Anderson Taylor, Colonial Secretary of the Bahama Islands and Administrator of the Government in the absence of the Governor
Augustus John Adderley, for many years Member of the Legislature of the Bahama Islands, and Commissioner for the Bahamas at the International Fisheries Exhibition, 1883
George Smyth Baden-Powell, one of Her Majesty's Commissioners appointed in 1882 to inquire into the Revenue and Expenditure, &c., of certain of the West Indian Colonies
Frederick Charles Heidenstam, Chief Medical Officer of the Government of Cyprus
William Crofton Twynam, Government Agent, Northern Province, Ceylon
William Alexander Pickering, Protector of Chinese in the Straits Settlements

The Most Eminent Order of the Indian Empire

Companion (CIE)
Alfred Woodley Croft, Director of Public Instruction, Bengal
The Reverend William Miller, Principal of the Christian College, Madras
Kashinath Trimbak Telang, Barrister-at-Law, Bombay
Benjamin Lewis Rice, Director of Public Instruction, Mysore and Coorg
Captain George O'Brien Theodore Carew (late Indian Navy), Deputy-Director of Indian Marine
Sheikh Shuruf-ud-din, Raees of Sheikhupur
Rai Bahadur Kanai Lai Dé
Colonel Charles Edward Stewart, Bengal Staff Corps, employed on a special mission on the Perso-Afghan frontier
Durga Charan Laha, late Member of the Council of the Viceroy and Governor-General of India for making Laws and Regulations
Edward Thomas, Bengal Civil Service (Retired)

References

Birthday Honours
1884 awards
1884 in Australia
1884 in India
1884 in the United Kingdom